Staryye Kaltasy (İśke Qaltası) is a rural locality (a village) in Kaltasinsky Selsoviet, Kaltasinsky District, Bashkortostan, Russia. The population was 518 as of 2010. There are 12 streets.

Geography 
Staryye Kaltasy is located 2 km east of Kaltasy (the district's administrative centre) by road. Kaltasy is the nearest rural locality.

References 

Rural localities in Kaltasinsky District